The 1916 Lehigh Brown and White football team was an American football team that represented Lehigh University as an independent during the 1916 college football season. In its fifth season under head coach Tom Keady, the team compiled a 6–2–1 record and outscored opponents by a total of 171 to 45. The team played its home games at Taylor Stadium in South Bethlehem, Pennsylvania.

Schedule

References

Lehigh
Lehigh Mountain Hawks football seasons
Lehigh football